Mensing is a German surname. Notable people with the surname include:

 Barbara Mensing (born 1960), German archer
 Johannes Mensing (1477–1547), German Dominican theologian
 Jenny Mensing (born 1986), German swimmer
 Simon Mensing (born 1982), footballer
 Gladys Mensing, who was a party to the PLIVA, Inc. v. Mensing case decided by the Supreme Court of the United States in 2011

German-language surnames